No. 23 Group RAF was a group of the Royal Air Force, first established in 1918, and finally disbanded in 1975.

The group was reformed as No 23 (Training) Group in RAF Inland Area on 12 April 1926, at RAF Spitalgate, by re-numbering No. 3 Group RAF. Its stations were RAF Digby, Eastchurch, Flowerdown, Manston, and RAF Sealand, while it commanded 1 (Netheravon), 2, and 5 FTSs; the Armament and Gunnery School at Eastchurch; the School of Technical Training (Airmen) at RAF Manston; the Central Flying School at RAF Upavon, and finally the Electrical and Wireless School at RAF Flowerdown. 

The Group was transferred to RAF Training Command on 1 May 1936. The RAF List for 1938 records that it comprised the Central Flying School; 1-3 and 5-11 Flying Training Schools; the Packing Depot at Sealand; the School of Air Navigation and No. 48 Squadron RAF at Manston; the Station Flight and No. 24 MU at Tern Hill; and No. 27 MU at RAF Shawbury. In September 1939 it controlled Nos 1, 2, 3, 5, 6, 7, 9, 10, 11, and 12 Service Flying Training Schools, the Aeroplane and Armament Experimental Establishment at RAF Martlesham Heath, and the group communications flight co-located with Group Headquarters at RAF Spitalgate in Lincolnshire. 

It was then transferred again to RAF Flying Training Command on 27 May 1940. In December 1940, after his successful leadership of No. 11 Group RAF during the Battle of Britain, Air Vice Marshal Keith Park was transferred into Training Command. He become Air Officer Commanding 23 Group on 27 December 1940.

After 1 January 1957, No. 23 Group was responsible for Nos 1 - 5, No. 6 Flying Training School RAF (1957-68), No. 7 (from 1957-60) and No. 8 Flying Training School RAF (from 1957-64). The Group Headquarters moved to RAF Church Fenton in 1959 and then to RAF Dishforth in 1962. It was reabsorbed into RAF Training Command in 1968; it disbanded at RAF Linton-on-Ouse on 2 May 1975.

Training Command itself disbanded in 1977, and by 1982 flying training units were being directed by Air Officer Training and AOC Training Units at Headquarters RAF Support Command.

Postwar Air Officers Commanding 
 1945 (precise date unknown) - Air Vice Marshal Frank Inglis
 3 February 1947 - Air Vice Marshal Arthur Ledger
 20 February 1950 - Air Vice Marshal Lawrence ('Johnny') Darvall MC
 September 1951 - Air Vice Marshal Allan Hesketh CB, CBE, DFC
 9 April 1952 - Air Vice Marshal Francis Long CB
 12 October 1953 - Air Vice Marshal George Harvey
 19 December 1955 - Air Vice Marshal Henry Graham DSO DFC
 1 December 1958 - Air Vice Marshal Colin Scragg CBE, AFC & bar
 15 December 1960 - Air Vice Marshal William Coles DSO, DFC & bar, AFC
 29 August 1963 - Air Vice Marshal Peter Philpott CBE
 23 August 1965 - Air Vice Marshal Michael Lyne, AFC & two bars
 15 December 1967 - Air Vice Marshal Harry Burton CBE, DSO
 6 February 1970 - Air Vice Marshal Harold Bird-Wilson, CBE, DSO, DFC & bar, AFC & bar
 3 March 1973 - Air Vice Marshal John Gingell CBE (listed in post as AOC 23 Group until 6 June 1975)

References 

023
Training units and formations of the Royal Air Force
Military units and formations disestablished in 1975